Bothie may refer to:
Bothie, the polar explorer dog
Dualphotography, a technique for taking two photographs at once, also known as 'bothie'
Bothy, a shelter